Josh Stones (born 12 November 2003) is an English professional footballer who plays for Ross County, on loan from Wigan Athletic, as a striker.

Career
Stones began his career with Guiseley, being selected for England Schools, before moving to Wigan Athletic in summer 2022. He moved on loan to Ross County in January 2023.

References

2003 births
Living people
English footballers
Guiseley A.F.C. players
Wigan Athletic F.C. players
Ross County F.C. players
National League (English football) players
Scottish Professional Football League players
Association football forwards